Arithmetic is an elementary branch of mathematics that is widely used for tasks ranging from simple day-to-day counting to advanced science and business calculations.

Essence of arithmetic
Elementary arithmetic
Decimal arithmetic
Decimal point
Numeral
Place value
Face value

History of arithmetic

Arithmetic operations and related concepts

Order of operations
Addition
Sum
Additive inverse
Subtraction
Multiplication
Multiplicative inverse
Multiple
Common multiple
Division
Quotient
Quotition and partition
Fraction
Decimal fraction
Proper fraction
Improper fraction
Vulgar fraction
Ratio
Common denominator
Factoring
Fundamental theorem of arithmetic
Prime number
Prime number theorem
Distribution of primes
Composite number
Factor
Common factor
Euclid's algorithm for finding greatest common divisors
Exponentiation (power)
Exponent
Square root
Cube root
Properties of operations
Associative property
Commutative property
Distributive property

Types of numbers

Real number
Rational number
Integer
Natural number
Composite number
Irrational number
Odd number
Even number
Positive number
Negative number
Prime number
List of prime numbers
Highly composite number
Perfect number
Algebraic number
Transcendental number
Hypercomplex number
Transfinite number
Indefinite and fictitious numbers

Elementary statistics
Mean
Weighted mean
Median
Mode

Other basic concepts
Combinations
Percentage
Permutations
Proportion
Rounding
Scientific notation

Modern arithmetic
Outline of number theory
Riemann zeta function
L-functions
Multiplicative functions
Modular forms

See also
Elementary mathematics
Table of mathematical symbols

External links

MathWorld article about arithmetic
The New Student's Reference Work/Arithmetic (historical)
Maximus Planudes' the Great Calculation an early western work on arithmetic at Convergence

Arithmetic
Arithmetic
 
Arithmetic